Carlo Vincenzo Ferrero d'Ormea (5 April 1680, Mondovì – 29 May 1745, Turin) was an Italian politician and diplomat. He was president of the Council of the Kingdom of Sardinia from 1742 to 1745.

Life

Early career – from prefect to general of finances (1713–24)

Embassy to Rome and concordat with Benedict XIII (1724–30)
He was repeatedly sent to the court of pope Benedict XIII and gained the pope's recognition of Vittorio Amedeo II as King of Sardinia as well as concluding a concordat with the papacy in 1727, thus normalising Sardinia's relations with the papal states, which had been strained for the previous thirty years.

Secretary of State to the Interior (1730–42), for foreign affairs (1732–45) and Grand Chancellor

Sources
 Bio]
Roberto Gaja, Il marchese d'Ormea, Milano, Bompiani, 1988
Nobiltà e Stato in Piemonte. I Ferrero d'Ormea, atti del convegno (Torino-Mondovì, 3-5 ottobre 2001), a cura di Andrea Merlotti, Torino, Zamorani, 2003

1680 births
1745 deaths
Italian diplomats
Kingdom of Sardinia